Epiphania, Epifania or Pyphania (died 800) is recorded in the late medieval traditions of Pavia as daughter of Ratchis (744/749 – 756/757), King of the Lombards and of Italy.

She was buried in the monastery of S. Maria Foris Portam, which was founded in Pavia, the Lombard capital, by her father.

References
.

Medieval Italian saints
People from Pavia
8th-century Christian saints
Christian female saints of the Middle Ages
8th-century Italian women
9th-century Italian women
800 deaths